Jalaladdin Akhsitan was the 27th Shirvanshah. He was executed by the order of Hulagu. Very little is known about him.

References

1260 deaths
Year of birth unknown
13th-century Iranian people